Munson Rufus Hill (May 4, 1821 – October 24, 1867) was an American lawyer, politician and Confederate officer. Hill was born in Monroe County, New York. In 1839 he moved to Dyersburg, Tennessee and then Trenton, Tennessee ten years later. He attended Cazenovia Seminary in New York. In his antebellum career, he served as a lawyer and in the Tennessee state legislature, and married Elizabeth Hale. Hill was appointed colonel with the 47th Tennessee Infantry Regiment. He resigned his colonelship on January 5, 1863 due to "remittant [sic] fever" and gastroenteritis. Later that year, he lost a race for the Confederate States Congress. Hill died on October 24, 1867 of yellow fever in Memphis. He is buried at Oakland Cemetery in Trenton, Tennessee. Hill's step-brother Lyman Rufus Casey was a U.S. Senator from South Dakota.

References

Members of the Tennessee General Assembly
1821 births
1867 deaths
Tennessee lawyers
Confederate States Army officers
People from Monroe County, New York
People from Dyersburg, Tennessee
People from Trenton, Tennessee
People of Tennessee in the American Civil War
19th-century American politicians
19th-century American lawyers